Sri Lanka is a tropical island situated close to the southern tip of India. The invertebrate fauna is as large as it is common to other regions of the world. There are about 2 million species of arthropods found in the world, and still it is counting. So many new species are discover up to this time also. So it is very complicated and difficult to summarize the exact number of species found within a certain region.

The following list is about Phasmids recorded in Sri Lanka.

Phasmid
Phylum: Arthropoda
Class: Insecta
Order: Phasmatodea

The Phasmatodea (also known as Phasmida or Phasmatoptera) are an order of insects, whose members are variously known as stick insects (in Europe and Australasia), stick-bugs or walking sticks (in the United States and Canada), phasmids, ghost insects and leaf insects (generally the family Phylliidae). The group's name is derived from the Ancient Greek φάσμα phasma, meaning an apparition or phantom, referring to the resemblance of many species to sticks or leaves. Their natural camouflage makes them difficult for predators to detect, but many species have a secondary line of defence in the form of startle displays, spines or toxic secretions. The genus Phobaeticus includes the world's longest insects.

The classification of the Phasmatodea is complex and the relationships between its members are poorly understood. Furthermore, there is much confusion over the ordinal name.  Phasmida is preferred by many authors, though it is incorrectly formed; Phasmatodea is correctly formed, and is widely accepted. The order is divided into two, or sometimes three, suborders.

The following list provide the phasmids currently identified in Sri Lanka. Major works on Sri Lankan phasmids were done by Henneman in 2002. Before his taxonomic works, it was noted that there are 85 species within the country. After extensive studies by Henneman in 2002 during field works from four locations around central hills, he revised the exact number of species found in Sri Lanka, where he found synonyms specimens and few new species as well. According to Henneman checklist, there are 69 accepted species can be seen in Sri Lanka.

Endemic species are denoted as E.

Family: Aschiphasmatidae
Abrosoma exiguum
Abrosoma nebulosum
Abrosoma virescens

Family: Diapheromeridae
Asceles opacus
Charmides cerberus
Lopaphus srilankensis
Miniphasma prima
Miniphasma secunda
Paramenexenus ceylonicus
Paramenexenus inconspicuus
Paramenexenus subalienus
Paraprisomera coronata
Paraprisomera taprobanae
Parasipyloidea minuta
Parasipyloidea seiferti
Parasipyloidea zehntneri
Parasosibia ceylonica
Parasosibia incerta
Sceptrophasma humilis
Sipyloidea acutipennis
Sipyloidea bistriolata
Sipyloidea ceylonica
Sipyloidea panaetius
Sipyloidea sipylus
Sosibia passalus
Sosibia quadrispinosa
Trachythorax expallescens
Trachythorax sparaxes

Family: Phasmatidae
Cuniculina cunicula
Cuniculina obnoxia
Lonchodes denticauda
Lonchodes femoralis
Lonchodes flavicornis
Lonchodes praon
Paraprisomera coronata
Paraprisomera taprobanae
Phobaeticus hypharpax
Phobaeticus lobulatus
Prisomera auscultator
Prisomera cyllabacum
Prisomera ignava
Prisomera mimas
Prisomera spinicollis
Prisomera spinosissimum
Ramulus ablutus
Ramulus braggi
Ramulus ceylonense
Ramulus lineaticeps
Ramulus lobulatus
Ramulus pseudoporus
Ramulus trilineatus

Family: Phylliidae - Leaf insects
Phyllium athanysus
Phyllium bioculatum
Phyllium brevipenne
Phyllium geryon
Phyllium hausleithneri

Family: Prisopodidae

References

L
 
Phasmatodea
Sri Lanka